KFOK may refer to:

 KFOK-LP, a low-power radio station (95.1 FM) licensed to Georgetown, California, United States
 Francis S. Gabreski Airport (ICAO code KFOK)